Loppersum is a railway station located in Loppersum, the Netherlands. The station was opened on 15 June 1884 and is located on the Groningen–Delfzijl railway. The service is operated by Arriva.

Train service
The following services currently call at Loppersum:
2x per hour local service (stoptrein) Groningen - Delfzijl

References

External links

 Loppersum station, station information

Transport in Eemsdelta
Railway stations in Groningen (province)
Railway stations opened in 1884